Sir Lee Llewellyn Moore  (15 February 1939 – 6 May 2000) served as Premier of Saint Kitts and Nevis from 20 May 1979 to 21 February 1980. He was a member of the Saint Kitts and Nevis Labour Party. He graduated with an LLB from King's College London, and later earned an LLM and a Diploma in Theology.

Lee became an aide to Premier Robert Llewellyn Bradshaw in 1967, and was appointed attorney general in 1971. He became Deputy Premier in the cabinet of Paul Southwell. When Southwell died, Lee became Premier in 1979 but lost in the 1980 general election. He remained as leader of the opposition until 1989, when he resigned from Labour party leadership.

The courthouse in St. Kitts was renamed in his honour.

References

1936 births
2000 deaths
Alumni of King's College London
Knights Commander of the Order of St Michael and St George
Permanent Representatives of Saint Kitts and Nevis to the United Nations
20th-century Saint Kitts and Nevis lawyers
Saint Kitts and Nevis Labour Party politicians
Prime Ministers of Saint Kitts and Nevis
Deputy Prime Ministers of Saint Kitts and Nevis
Attorneys General of Saint Kitts and Nevis